Gold Heels is a 1924 American silent drama film produced and distributed by Fox Film Corporation and directed by W. S. Van Dyke. The film is loosely based on legendary racing horse Gold Heels and the novel Checkers by Henry Martyn Blossom.

Plot
As described in a review in a film magazine, following a steak of hard luck at the race track, Boots (Agnew) and his pal Push (Littlefield) rescue a chap from thugs. Boots takes him to his hometown. He is attracted to a young woman, Pert Barlow (Shaw), and gets a job in her father's (Stockdale) store. Old Barlow owns the broken-down horse, Gold Heels, which Boots buys. A child dies because of the deplorable conditions at the orphanage and Pert starts a campaign to get a new one. Barlow takes charge of the money but it is stolen. Boots is accused of the theft and is jailed, but his pals get him out. He returns to the city. On the day of the big race, he and his pals go to the village, take Gold Heels and load him in an automobile, and after a wild ride reach the track and win the race. Boots is vindicated and Old Barlow suggests that he is willing to have him as a son-in-law.

Cast

Preservation
A print of Gold Heels is held at the Museum of Modern Art, New York City.

References

External links

1924 films
American silent feature films
Films directed by W. S. Van Dyke
Fox Film films
1924 drama films
Silent American drama films
American black-and-white films
1920s American films